Pulled string painting is a painting method using pulled strings.

Notes

References 
 A Handbook of Arts and Crafts, Phillip R. Wigg, Jean Hasselschwert, 1968

Painting techniques